Nirina Raudatul Jannah Zubir or better known as Nirina Zubir (born in Antananarivo, Madagascar on March 12, 1980) is an Indonesian actress and Television presenter of Minangkabau descent.

Early life and career
Nirina was Born in Antananarivo, Madagascar to expatriate Indonesian parents of ethnic Minangkabau origin hailing from Pariaman, West Sumatra, where her father, Zubir Amin was working as a senior diplomat with the Indonesian Embassy in that country. 
Her name was a special given one from the Malagasy language and was registered at birth as Nirina Raudhatul Jannah Zubir.

Nirina graduated from the STIE Perbanas School of Economics. She eventually looked for other options as soon as graduation. She admitted to never imagine in becoming a radio DJ. Her first career at MTVonSky radio station (now MTV Sky) was a coincidence. According to Nirina, it was her friends who applied to MTVonSky under her name.

Her friends' move turned into a major change in her life. Quite beyond her expectations, MTVonSky hired Nirina because of her distinctive noisy-yet-witty personality.

“So there was my [first] opportunity [in the entertainment world].”

That first opportunity had led Nirina to bigger and better things. After landing one of the coolest jobs around — MTV video jockey — Nirina quickly gained fame. Her other talents were then noticed, including her ability to speak Mandarin, which she learned while living in Hong Kong and China for several years as a child. Former president Megawati Sukarnoputri even asked Nirina to become her personal interpreter during the 2000 Indonesian visit by the Chinese vice president. Her popularity then led to some movie roles, including in 30 Hari Mencari Cinta (30 Days to Find Love) and Mirror.

And it wouldn’t be Nirina if she didn’t have plenty of things to pursue. Her rising popularity as an MTV VJ for Indonesia tickled her ambitious side to think of spreading her wings onto the international scene. As her contract with MTV Indonesia neared its end, Nirina made plans: She was eyeing the position of international VJ for MTV Southeast Asia.

“The thing is, I wouldn’t give up on that. Not until they told me: ‘Enough, ‘Na [short for Nirina]’," she once said of her ambitious plan.

The ambitious plan was never realized. After resigning from MTV Indonesia in 2005, Nirina’s international VJ career never materialized. Instead, she hosted several TV shows and starred in more movies, including Belahan Jiwa (Soul Mate), Heart, Kamulah Satu-satunya (You’re the Only One), Get Married and again in her latest release, Get Married 2.

Nirina has continued to grow as an actress, receiving several awards, including the prestigious 2006 Indonesian Film Festival Award and the 2008 Indonesia Movie Award — both for best actress.

Looking back at her achievements, Nirina realizes now how she truly fell in love with performing arts.

Nirina studied for a degree in bachelor's degree in Management Banking at the STIE Perbanas Kuningan, in Jakarta before beginning as a model. She is fluent in her native Indonesian, and in English and Chinese. 

She made her full film debut in 2004 in the film 30 hari mencari cinta playing the role of Gwen.

In 2007, she played the lead role in the comedy film Kamulah satu-satunya.

Besides her acting career she has presented a number of Indonesian mainstream TV shows and has modelled in many adverts commercially in the country including for, Herbal Essences (2005–2006).

Filmography
30 Hari Mencari Cinta (2004) as Gwen
Mirror (2005) as Kikan
Belahan Jiwa (2005) as Baby Blue and Baby Pink
Heart (2006) as Rachel
Kamulah Satu-Satunya (2007) as Indah
Love Is Cinta (2007) as Reporter
Get Married (2007) as Maemunah
Get Married 2 (2010) as Maemunah
Get Married 3 (2011) as Maemunah
Purple Love (2011) as Talita
Bidadari-Bidadari Surga (2012) as Laisa
Ali & Ratu Ratu Queens (2021) as Party
Paranoia (2021) as Dina

Sinetron

 Untukmu Segalanya (1994)
 Untukmu Segalanya 2 (1996)
 Tersanjung 1-6 (1998)
 Diva (2008)
 Assalamualaikum Cinta (2008)

Commercial

 L'Oréal (2002)
 Toyota Yaris (2006)

Magazine 
 Kawanku Magazine, February 2002
 Seventeen Magazine, September 2003
 Fit Magazine, April 2004
 Hai Magazine, October 2005

Music Video Model

 Sheila On 7 - Melompat Lebih Tinggi
 Sheila On 7 - Berhenti Berharap
 Gigi - Perihal Cinta
 Acha Septriasa & Irwansyah - My Heart
 Nidji - Sudah
 Slank - Pandangan Pertama
 Slank - Cubit2tan
 Slank - PLIS

Song

 Hari Ini, Esok dan Seterusnya (2006)

Hosts

 Indonesian Idol (Season 4)
 Anugerah Planet Muzik (Music Planet Award)

Awards and nominations

References

External links and sources 

1980 births
Living people
People from Antananarivo
Indonesian film actresses
Indonesian female models
21st-century Indonesian women singers
Indonesian pop singers
Minangkabau people
Indonesian women television presenters